is a Japanese footballer currently playing as an attacking midfielder for Sagan Tosu.

Career statistics

Club

Notes

References

External links

2001 births
Living people
Association football people from Fukuoka Prefecture
Japanese footballers
Japan youth international footballers
Association football midfielders
J1 League players
Sagan Tosu players